George Ford, also listed as Roy Ford, was an American baseball second baseman in the Negro leagues. He played with the Baltimore Black Sox from 1920 to 1924 and the Harrisburg Giants in 1922.

References

External links
 and Baseball-Reference Black Baseball stats and Seamheads

Baltimore Black Sox players
Harrisburg Giants players
Year of birth unknown
Year of death unknown
Baseball second basemen